Carlo Cudicini (born 6 September 1973) is a retired Italian footballer who played as a goalkeeper. He is the son of the former Milan goalkeeper Fabio Cudicini, and the grandson of Ponziana defender Guglielmo Cudicini. Cudicini is currently a club ambassador and loan player technical coach at Chelsea.

Cudicini started his professional career at Serie A side Milan in 1992, but struggled to break into the first team and was loaned to Como before moving to Prato and then Lazio in 1996. Having only made a single league appearance for Lazio, he moved a year later to Castel di Sangro and then to Premier League side Chelsea in 1999, initially on loan. He dislodged Ed de Goey from the number one spot and was voted Chelsea's Player of the Year for the 2001–02 season and remained first choice until Petr Čech was signed in 2004. Cudicini left Chelsea in January 2009, having made 141 league appearances for the club, and joined local rivals Tottenham Hotspur. At Tottenham, he remained second- or third-choice throughout his spell, and only made 19 league appearances for the club. In 2013, Cudicini signed for Los Angeles Galaxy of Major League Soccer, where he played the final season of his career.

Cudicini played 20 times for the Italy under-18 team between 1990 and 1992, and made a single appearance for the under-21 team, but never played for the senior team. In 2003, during his successful period at Chelsea, The Football Association attempted to select him for the England national team, but he was ineligible.

Early career
Cudicini made only two appearances for Milan (1992–95) in the Champions League, one in the Coppa Italia and none in Serie A during that period in the club's history. He featured on the bench in the 1993 Champions League final against Marseille. He was loaned to Como for a season in 1993–94, and was subsequently transferred to Prato in 1995, and then to Lazio in 1996 where he suffered a serious wrist injury, and consequently only made one senior appearance. He then moved to Castel di Sangro in 1997, where his injury problems persisted. However, he was recommended to the Chelsea manager Gianluca Vialli by his friend, the Lazio goalkeeper Luca Marchegiani, and was sold to Chelsea for a fee of £300,000 in 1999.

Club career

Chelsea

1999–2004
After making his debut against Skonto Riga in a UEFA Champions League qualifier, Cudicini ended his first season at Chelsea with just 3 appearances in all competitions. He was however on the bench as Chelsea won the 2000 FA Cup Final. The following season, he started to appear more regularly and shared the starting spot with Ed de Goey (Cudicini started 23 league games, De Goey 15). Despite a brief challenge from Mark Bosnich in the 2001–02 season, he retained his first team place with a string of excellent performances.

He was voted Chelsea's Player of the Year for the 2001–02 season by fans, reflecting the value he added to a team struggling for consistency. In December 2001, he saved two penalties in a span of seven days from Sunderland's Kevin Phillips and Liverpool's Gary McAllister.

Cudicini was recognised as the best goalkeeper in the Premier League in the 2002–2003 season, when he won the ITV Premiership Goalkeeper of the Season award. Cudicini also saved a penalty from Arsenal's Thierry Henry to help earn his side a replay in the FA Cup.

After a bright start to the 2003–04 season, the old injury problems experienced in his Lazio days came back, leaving him unable to carry on his success from last season and unable to play for a large portion of the season. His value to the team was highlighted when Chelsea's replacement goalkeeper Marco Ambrosio failed to effectively fit into the first team, leading to Chelsea's exit from the Champions League at the semi final stage to Monaco. He further demonstrated his penalty saving prowess with a save from Manchester United's Ruud van Nistelrooy in a crucial Premier League tie. However, he later made a mistake in the same game and allowing the same player to equalise, but Chelsea nonetheless secured a 1–1 draw that was enough for automatic UEFA Champions League qualification.

2004–05
The 2004–05 season saw the arrival of new manager José Mourinho. Cudicini saw competition after the arrival of Petr Čech. Čech claimed that he would push Cudicini for a first team place and Cudicini was dropped to the substitute bench. As a result, he missed out on a Premier League winners' medal as he managed only three league appearances all season, all of which came after Chelsea had secured the trophy. He did, however, feature in most of Chelsea's FA Cup and League Cup games that season. Chelsea reached the 2005 Football League Cup Final, however Cudicini was suspended as he had been sent off in an FA Cup tie the week before against Newcastle United. This meant that Čech started and Lenny Pidgeley was on the bench.

2005–06
Cudicini again was second choice to Čech, and managed only four league appearances as Chelsea won the Premier League for the second year in a row. At the end of that season, Cudicini had saved 6 of the 12 penalties he had faced while between the posts for Chelsea, furthering his reputation as an excellent penalty stopper.

2006–07
After Petr Čech was named in the FIFPro and Champions League 2005–06 team of the season, there was a great deal of speculation about Cudicini's future at Chelsea, leading to Cudicini release a statement confirming that he was comfortable at Chelsea, and hoped to help the team capture its first-ever Champions League title. He silenced rumours that he was looking for a return to Italy when he signed an extension to his Chelsea contract in February 2006. He was then contracted to Chelsea until the summer of 2009.

On 14 October 2006, in a league game against Reading, he was knocked unconscious and had to be stretchered off the pitch while wearing an oxygen mask after coming on as a substitute for first-choice goalkeeper Čech. Čech was believed to be sidelined for up to a year, leaving Cudicini as the most senior goalkeeper available at Chelsea. However, even though he had fully recovered and returned to training, Cudicini faced a battle to dislodge third-choice goalkeeper Henrique Hilário, who had been playing well in Čech's and Cudicini's absence. After Hilário conceded four goals in two matches, Chelsea manager José Mourinho decided to put Cudicini in goal against Aston Villa in their fourth round match of the League Cup. Chelsea won that match 4–0 and Cudicini took over goalkeeping duties from Hilário.

However, after returning to action in Chelsea's 2–0 defeat to Liverpool at Anfield in late January 2007, Čech kept both Cudicini and Hilário out of the first team. Cudicini's lack of action for Chelsea since 2004 and his reluctance to move to a new club saw him described as "the world's most unambitious footballer" by The Daily Telegraph in 2008. Cudicini was on the bench as Chelsea won the 2007 FA Cup Final, but Hilario was preferred as the substitute goalkeeper as they won the 2007 Football League Cup Final.

2007–08

Cudicini began the new campaign once again as second-choice to Čech, but a string of injuries to the Czech star saw Cudicini feature 19 times in all competitions. His first appearance of the season was in a League Cup game against Hull City in which he kept a clean sheet in a 4–0 win. He played against Leicester City in a 4–3 win at Stamford Bridge in the next round before making his first appearance of the season in the Champions League, coming on as a substitute against Schalke 04. Cudicini then featured in the next five games due to Čech's injury, conceding just one goal in the process, against Everton at Stamford Bridge in a 1–1 draw. However, the Italian shot-stopper suffered an injury and would not be seen between the posts until February in a FA Cup game against Huddersfield Town. He also featured in the next round of the cup, but Chelsea lost 1–0 to Barnsley and were knocked out of the competition. Cudicini retained his place due to another injury suffered by Čech and featured in Chelsea's 6–1 win over Derby County. He kept clean sheets in 1–0 wins against Sunderland and Middlesbrough, as well as a 2–0 away win at Manchester City and played in Chelsea's 2–1 win over local rivals Arsenal in March. Cudicini made an outstanding save in the last minutes of an epic 4–4 draw at White Hart Lane against Tottenham Hotspur when he saved from point-blank range against Dimitar Berbatov to earn Chelsea a point. He featured in both legs against Turkish club Fenerbahçe as Chelsea progressed 3–2 on aggregate; unfortunately; he limped off with an injury that effectively ended his season. Cudicini made his 200th appearance for the club (in all competitions) against West Ham United on 1 December 2007. He was an unused substitute as Chelsea lost both the 2008 Football League Cup Final and the 2008 UEFA Champions League Final.

2008–09
Cudicini made his first Premier League appearance of the season in Chelsea's 5–0 win at Middlesbrough and this marked his 100th clean sheet in a Chelsea shirt. He played his last game for Chelsea at home in the FA Cup 3rd Round tie with Southend United which ended in a 1–1 draw.

Tottenham Hotspur

2008–09
On 26 January 2009, it was confirmed that Cudicini signed for Tottenham Hotspur on a free transfer. He was allowed to move on a free due to his services given to Chelsea. He made his debut for Spurs on 27 January 2009 in the Premier League fixture against Stoke City, a 3–1 win. Following Tottenham's loss in the League Cup final against Manchester United (for which Cudicini was cup-tied), Cudicini's appearances were limited. He did not play again for Spurs in the 2008–09 season after the 1–2 victory over Hull City at the KC Stadium a week before the 2009 Football League Cup Final.

2009–10
Cudicini made his first competitive appearance in nearly six months for Tottenham when he came on as a substitute for the injured Heurelho Gomes in a 5–1 victory over Hull City on 19 August 2009. He played a number of matches, including a 3–0 defeat at his former club Chelsea on 20 September which saw him return to Stamford Bridge for the first time since leaving the club. He was then benched in favour of the returning Gomes for the match against Portsmouth at Fratton Park.

On 12 November, Cudicini was involved in a serious motorcycle accident in Walthamstow, east London, on his way to Tottenham's training ground. It was reported that he had fractured both his wrists and injured his pelvis. He was taken to an east London hospital then later was transferred to a private hospital. In late February, the Tottenham Hotspur website reported that Cudicini had started some ball work.

On 12 May, Cudicini signed a new one-year contract with Spurs. On 10 July, Cudicini played 45 minutes in a pre-season friendly against AFC Bournemouth, his first action since his accident.

2010–11
On 25 August 2010, Cudicini saw his first official action for the club in nearly a year as a half-time replacement for the injured Gomes in the second leg of Tottenham's UEFA Champions League play-off round tie against Young Boys of Switzerland. Three days later, he started against Wigan Athletic in the Premier League at White Hart Lane but was criticised for conceding the Latics' winning goal scored by Hugo Rodallega. Despite putting in some consistently good performances for Spurs, he was again benched in favour of Gomes for the Champions League group stage match against Twente on 29 September. He was an eighth-minute replacement for Luka Modrić after Gomes' sending-off against Internazionale on 20 October, but was powerless to stop the defending Champions League winners from scoring three times in a 4–3 loss at the San Siro. He went on to play in the return match on 2 November at White Hart Lane as Spurs earned a famous 3–1 victory. On 10 May 2011, Cudicini gave a very solid performance against Manchester City at Eastlands. He made two good saves to deny City a winning goal, but Tottenham still lost 1–0 through an own goal from Peter Crouch.

2011–12
Following the signing of Brad Friedel from Aston Villa on a free transfer, Cudicini again continued to act as back-up goalkeeper with previous first-choice goalkeeper Heurelho Gomes relegated to third-choice. Cudicini was, however, used as first choice goalkeeper during Tottenham's Europa League matches, making his first start of the season against PAOK in a 0–0 draw. During the match, Cudicini let in an Alves Lino penalty, but Lino was asked to retake the penalty and subsequently missed. Cudicini also played in the 2012 FA Cup semi-final against former club Chelsea.

2012–13
Cudicini started the season second choice to Friedel, but after the addition of Hugo Lloris to the squad, Cudicini was limited to the role as the back-up goalkeeper in Tottenham's Europa League campaign. His final appearance for the club was in a 0–3 win against Carlisle United at Brunton Park in a third round League Cup tie on the 26th of September 2012.

LA Galaxy

Cudicini was transferred to the LA Galaxy of Major League Soccer (MLS) on 31 December 2012 on a free transfer. He made his debut in a 4–0 win over Chicago Fire.

Cudicini was released by the Galaxy on 26 January 2014.

International career
Cudicini was capped at under-18 and under-21 level, but never represented his country of birth at senior level. He was called into the squad for the 2002 friendly against Turkey, but was not named in the matchday squad by Giovanni Trapattoni, behind Gianluigi Buffon and Francesco Toldo.
 
The FA have previously claimed he could be eligible to represent England, however, similar to the case of Mikel Arteta, he was not. He was not eligible for England because FIFA Statutes stipulate that the player needs to have held a British passport at the time when he represented Italy at the U16 European Championship, and would have required five years of education in Britain before turning 18.

Style of play
A large, quick, agile and athletic keeper, Cudicini was regarded as one of the best goalkeepers in the Premier League and in the world in his prime, and is considered to be one of Chelsea's greatest goalkeepers, as well as one of the best Italian keepers of his generation. Although he was regarded as a talented prospect in his youth, he was a somewhat late bloomer, and only came to prominence in his late 20s. Despite not being a particularly commanding goalkeeper in the penalty area, as he is not particularly tall and does not possess particularly large hands, Cudicini was however an excellent and instinctive shot-stopper, who was known in particular for his positional sense, intelligence, and composure in goal, as well as his agility, speed, and explosive reactions, which made him effective at stopping penalties.

Coaching career
In March 2015, Cudicini joined the Republic of Ireland national under-21 football team coaching staff as goalkeeping coach.

In July 2016, Cudicini returned to Chelsea to become a club ambassador and assistant to the new first-team head coach Antonio Conte. He was present amongst the rest of the coaching staff during Chelsea's 2–1 home win over West Ham in their first match of the 2016–17 season. He continued the job under Maurizio Sarri in 2018–19 season.

In August 2019, Cudicini had been appointed technical coach for the players on loan from other clubs following Eddie Newton's move to Frank Lampard's backroom staff.

In December 2022, Cudicini received his UEFA Pro License in Dublin after attending the FAI Coach Education Department course.

Career statistics

Club

Honours
Chelsea
FA Cup: 1999–2000, 2006–07
Football League Cup: 2004–05, 2006–07
FA Community Shield: 2000, 2005

Individual
 ITV 'Golden Gloves' Goalkeeper of the Year: 2003
 Chelsea's Player of the Year: 2002

References

External links

Stats:
 National Team 
Profiles:
Yahoo/EuroSport
 
 
BBC 
 

1973 births
Living people
Footballers from Milan
Association football goalkeepers
Italian footballers
Italy youth international footballers
Italy under-21 international footballers
Italian expatriate footballers
Expatriate footballers in England
Expatriate soccer players in the United States
Italian expatriate sportspeople in England
A.S.D. Castel di Sangro Calcio players
A.C. Milan players
S.S. Lazio players
A.C. Prato players
Como 1907 players
Chelsea F.C. players
Tottenham Hotspur F.C. players
LA Galaxy players
Serie A players
Serie B players
Premier League players
Major League Soccer players
Italian expatriate sportspeople in the United States
FA Cup Final players
Chelsea F.C. non-playing staff